Compañía Minera Milpo is a Peruvian mining company headquartered in Lima and listed on the Lima Stock Exchange. The company was founded in 1949 and is owned by Brazilian conglomerate Grupo Votorantim.

It's engaged in the exploration and exploitation of mining claims, as well as in the extraction, concentration and sale of zinc, copper, lead, silver and gold. It operates four mining units: the El Porvenir mine, located in Pasco; the Ivan mine and refinery, located in Antofagasta, Chile; the Chapi mine, located in Moquegua, and the Cerro Lindo mine, located in Ica. It is also involved in two additional mining projects: Proyecto Pukaqaqa, focusing on the exploration and exploitation of copper in the department of Huancavelica, and Proyecto Hilarion, a poly-metallic extraction project established in the department of Ancash. During 2008, it merged by absorption with its subsidiaries Gestion Minera SA and Milpo Finance and Investments Inc Ltda.

References

External links

Companies of Peru
Votorantim Group